The MIA Mover is an automated people mover (APM) system which opened at the Miami International Airport (MIA) in metropolitan Miami, Florida, United States on September 9, 2011.  The MIA Mover is designed to quickly transport landside passengers between Miami International Airport's Main Terminal and the Miami Intermodal Center (MIC). The MIA Mover is one of three separate automated people movers operating at the airport. The others are the Skytrain, which operates within Concourse D, and the MIA e Train people mover connecting Concourse E's satellite building.

History

In 2007, construction of a people mover instead of an extension of the existing Metrorail system to the airport became the preferred option for local authorities to provide greater connectivity to the airport terminals (Metrorail will connect at Miami Airport Station). On March 2, 2009, ground was officially broken for the project. Projected to transport 48,000 daily visitors by 2020, the MIA Mover construction utilized design-build methods and was paid for from a combination of revenue from the Miami-Dade Aviation Department's Capital Improvement Program and the Florida Department of Transportation (FDOT).

In May 2012, MIA Mover suffered a minor derailment, and a breakdown in July 2017 required riders to walk along the tracks escorted by fire fighters.

System

Costing an estimated $259 million to complete, the  link travels east from the MIA Station, to Central Boulevard and finally to NW 21st Street, where it curves north into the MIC Station. The ride lasts approximately three minutes. The vehicles used are Mitsubishi Heavy Industries Crystal Movers (The same model also operates on the Skytrain in Concourse D).

Stations

The MIA Mover has two stations: the MIC Station and the MIA Station.

'MIC Station'
The MIC Station is the eastern terminus of the line located on the fourth floor of the MIC. The station contains direct access to the MIC's rental car center and Miami Airport Station where connections can be made to Metrorail, Tri-Rail, buses and taxicabs. The station is being constructed by FDOT.

'MIA Station'
The MIA Station is the western terminus of the line located on the third floor of the main terminal building between the Flamingo and Dolphin Parking Garages. Constructed by MDAD, a storage and maintenance facility for the APM vehicles is located beneath the MIA Station.

See also
List of airport people mover systems
Transportation in Miami
Metromover
Metrorail
Tri-Rail
Tomorrowland Transit Authority PeopleMover

References

Bibliography
 Schroeder, B.M. "MIA Mover APM: A Fixed Facilities Design-Build Perspective." Automated People Movers, 2009: Connecting People, Connecting Places, Connecting Modes: Proceedings of the Twelfth International Conference, May 31-June 3, 2009 : Atlanta, Georgia. Ed. Robert R. Griebenow. American Society of Civil Engineers.

Public transportation in Florida
Miami International Airport
Airport people mover systems in the United States
Airport rail links in the United States
Crystal Mover people movers
Railway lines opened in 2011
2011 establishments in Florida